XHLE-FM (branded as La Líder, la radio de Tampico) is an FM radio station in Ciudad Cuauhtémoc, Veracruz that serves the Tampico, Tamaulipas market.

History
XELE-AM 1300 received its concession on March 29, 1958, broadcasting from Tampico. The 1000-watt station remained on 1300 through 2003, when it moved its transmitter from Villa Cuauhtémoc, Veracruz, in Pueblo Viejo Municipality, to the XEMCA-AM facility in Los Pichones and changed frequencies to 920. Migration to FM was authorized in November 2010.

References

Spanish-language radio stations
Radio stations in Tampico
Radio stations in Veracruz